Bear Creek is a  tributary of the Pequest River in New Jersey in the United States.

Crossings
These crossings exist from north to south:

Shades Of Death Road
Interstate 80

See also
List of rivers of New Jersey

References

Rivers of New Jersey
Tributaries of the Delaware River
Rivers of Warren County, New Jersey